Dominique Elliott (born November 11, 1991) is an American professional basketball player for Cactus Tbilisi of the Georgian Superleague. He played college basketball at the Maryland.

Playing career
Elliott started his professional career with KK Krka of the Premier A Slovenian Basketball League and the ABA League in 2016. In 2017, he signed with Swiss Basketball League club Lions de Genève.

On January 2, 2018, Úrvalsdeild club Keflavík announced they had signed Elliott in place of recently released Stanley Robinson.

References

External links
RealGM.com profile
ESPN.com profile
Slovakian profile at kzs.si
Icelandic profile at kki.is

1991 births
Living people
African-American basketball players
American expatriate basketball people in Georgia (country)
ABA League players
American expatriate basketball people in Slovenia
Maryland Eastern Shore Hawks men's basketball
Power forwards (basketball)
Basketball players from Savannah, Georgia
Úrvalsdeild karla (basketball) players
Keflavík men's basketball players
American men's basketball players
Rapla KK players
American expatriate basketball people in Estonia
21st-century African-American sportspeople
American expatriate basketball people in North Macedonia
American expatriate basketball people in Switzerland
American expatriate basketball people in Iceland